Aultgrishan is a small crofting community near Gairloch, Ross-shire. It adjoins Melvaig, within Highland region and is in the Scottish council area of Highland.

Aultgrishan is reached from the main B8021 single-track B-road that forks from the A832 in Gairloch and follows the north coast of the sea loch, Loch Gairloch, travelling west through Lonemore to Big Sand, before travelling north past North Erradale through Peterburn and Aultgrishan before terminating at Melvaig. The road then becomes narrower and continues about four miles to Rua Reidh Lighthouse.

References

Populated places in Ross and Cromarty